Koroteyev or Koroteev is a Russian masculine surname, its feminine counterpart is Koroteyeva or Koroteeva. It may refer to
Anatoliy Koroteyev (born 1936), Russian theoretical physicist
Konstantin Koroteev (1901–1953), Soviet military officer
Mariya Koroteyeva (born 1981), Russian hurdler

Russian-language surnames